Tamara Markashanskaya (born 20 November 1954) is a Soviet cross-country skier. She competed in the women's 20 kilometres at the 1984 Winter Olympics.

Cross-country skiing results
All results are sourced from the International Ski Federation (FIS).

Olympic Games

World Cup

Season standings

Individual podiums
1 podium

Team podiums
 1 podium

References

External links

1954 births
Living people
Soviet female cross-country skiers
Olympic cross-country skiers of the Soviet Union
Cross-country skiers at the 1984 Winter Olympics
Sportspeople from Smolensk